is a passenger railway station located in the city of Gyōda, Saitama, Japan, operated by the private railway operator Chichibu Railway

Lines

Station layout

The station consists of a single island platform serving two tracks.

Platforms

Adjacent stations

History
Bushū-Araki Station opened on 1 April 1921.

Passenger statistics
In fiscal 2018, the station was used by an average of 371 passengers daily.

Surrounding area
 
 Gyōda Araki Elementary School

See also
 List of railway stations in Japan

References

External links

 Bushū-Araki Station timetable 

Railway stations in Japan opened in 1921
Railway stations in Saitama Prefecture
Gyōda